Shaqiri is an Albanian surname that may refer to
 Ardit Shaqiri (born 1985), Albanian footballer from North Macedonia 
 Artim Shaqiri (born 1973), footballer from North Macedonia
 Xherdan Shaqiri (born 1991), Swiss footballer
 Xhevdet Shaqiri (1923-1997), Albanian footballer

Albanian-language surnames